Eberhard Ferstl (16 January 1933 – 8 October 2019) was a German field hockey player who competed in the 1956 Summer Olympics and in the 1960 Summer Olympics. He was born in Munich.

References

External links
 

1933 births
2019 deaths
German male field hockey players
Olympic field hockey players of the United Team of Germany
Field hockey players at the 1956 Summer Olympics
Field hockey players at the 1960 Summer Olympics
Olympic bronze medalists for the United Team of Germany
Olympic medalists in field hockey
Sportspeople from Munich
Medalists at the 1956 Summer Olympics